Graceland is a historic house on the campus of Davis & Elkins College in Elkins, West Virginia.  It was the summer home of Henry Gassaway Davis, a United States senator from 1871–1883, and a major force in West Virginia's coal industry in the late 19th century.  The mansion was completed in 1893.  It is listed on the National Register of Historic Places and is part of the National Historic Landmark Davis and Elkins Historic District.  It is now the centerpiece of an inn and conference center.

References

Houses in Randolph County, West Virginia
Davis and Elkins family
Houses completed in 1893
Houses on the National Register of Historic Places in West Virginia
Queen Anne architecture in West Virginia
Individually listed contributing properties to historic districts on the National Register in West Virginia
National Register of Historic Places in Randolph County, West Virginia
Buildings and structures in Elkins, West Virginia